A Man Ain't Made of Stone is the twelfth studio album from American country music artist Randy Travis. Released in 1999 as his second (and final) album for the DreamWorks label, it produced four singles, of which only one — the title track — was a Top 40 hit on the Billboard country charts. Additionally, this album was the last of only three albums in Travis' career not to be produced by longtime producer, Kyle Lehning.

Two of this album's tracks were previously cut by other artists: "A Little Bitty Crack in Her Heart" on Sammy Kershaw's 1996 album Politics, Religion and Her, and "I'll Be Right Here Loving You" on Rhett Akins' 1998 album What Livin's All About.

Track listing

Personnel
 Michael Black - background vocals
 Mike Brignardello - bass guitar
 Carol Chase - background vocals
 Tabitha Fair - background vocals
 Paul Franklin - steel guitar
 Sonny Garrish - steel guitar
 Aubrey Haynie - fiddle, mandolin
 Paul Leim - drums
 Jerry McPherson - electric guitar
 Brent Mason - electric guitar
 Matt Rollings - keyboards, piano
 Brent Rowan - electric guitar
 John Wesley Ryles - background vocals
 Lisa Silver - background vocals
 Kim Parent - background vocals
 Gary Smith - keyboards, piano
 Russell Terrell - background vocals
 Randy Travis - lead vocals
 Cindy Richardson-Walker - background vocals
 Biff Watson - acoustic guitar
 Curtis Young - background vocals

Chart performance

References

1999 albums
DreamWorks Records albums
Randy Travis albums
Albums produced by Byron Gallimore
Albums produced by James Stroud